The spouse of the governor of Michigan is given an honorary position, styled as First Lady or First Gentleman of the State of Michigan. First spouses typically fill ceremonial roles, by acting as the official hostess/host. In this role, they often entertain dignitaries and prepare meetings, parties, and dinners. While the role is generally held by the spouse of the governor, if the governor is unmarried, like in the case of Frank Murphy, sometimes a relative, such as a sister, assumes the role.

First spouses

Notes

See also
List of governors of Michigan

References

 
First Spouses of Michigan
First Spouses